 

Taxation in premodern China varied greatly over time. The most important source of state revenue was the tax on agriculture, or land tax. During some dynasties, the government also imposed monopolies that became important sources of revenue. The monopoly on salt was especially lucrative and stable. Commercial taxes were generally quite low, except in times of war. Other means of state revenues were inflation, forced labor (the corvee), and expropriation of rich merchants and landowners. Below is a chart of the sources of state revenue in Imperial China.

See also
 History of canals in China, for their use in conveying the grain taxes

References

Citations

General sources 
 
 
 
 
 
 
 
 

Economic history of China
History of Imperial China
History of taxation
Taxation in China